Ch'ŏngryong station is a railway station located in Kŭmt'al-li, Sadong-guyŏk, P'yŏngyang, North Korea, on the P'yŏngdŏk Line of the Korean State Railway. It is also the starting point of the Myŏngdang Line to Myŏngdang.

History
The station was opened by the Chosen Government Railway on 1 November 1925, at the same time as the rest of the Myŏngdang Line.

References

Railway stations in North Korea
Buildings and structures in Pyongyang
Railway stations opened in 1925
1925 establishments in Korea